Liberty Center Mall is the fifth shopping mall in Bucharest, Romania. Opened in 2008, the construction site was an uncompleted hunger circus abandoned after the fall of the Communist system.

Liberty Center Mall features a 3D Cinema and an indoor ice rink. It is located on 151-171 Progresului Road near the intersection with Rahova street.

References

External links
Liberty Center Mall: Official website 

Shopping malls in Bucharest